PBK may refer to:
Phi Beta Kappa Society
PBK (composer)
Prajapita Brahma Kumaris
an abbreviation for paperback books
PBK (gene)
PBK Architects